Mary Rakow is an American novelist.

Life
She graduated magna cum laude and Phi Beta Kappa from University of California, Riverside, in 1970, from Harvard University with a master's degree in Theological Studies, and from Boston College with a Ph.D. in Theology, Alpha Sigma Nu Jesuit Honor Society.   Her work has appeared in Works & Conversations. 
She has appeared on Writers on Writing, with Barbara DeMarco-Barrett KUCI-FM.

Rakow is a member of PEN Center USA/West, where she has mentored in the PEN Rosenthal Emerging Voices Program. 

Rakow is a novelist and freelance editor living in San Francisco as an urban hermit in the ancient Catholic Christian tradition.

Awards
 2002 10 Best Books in the West, L.A. Times, 2002
 2003 Lannan Literary Fellowship
 2003 William Saroyan International Prize for Writing shortlist
 2010 Whale and Star residency in the studio of Enrique Martínez Celaya

Works
 
 
 Matthew Biro, Leo A. Harrington, Mary Rakow (2012). Martinez Celaya, Working Methods. Ediciones Poligrafa. .
 Mary Rakow. (15 Dec 2015). This Is Why I Came, a novel. Counterpoint Press.  .

Anthology

Theology
 "Christ's Descent into Hell: Calvin's Interpretation", Religion in Life, 43, (Summer 1974)

References

External links
Mary Rakow's website
"Three Questions for Mary Rakow", The Los Angeles Times, Susan Salter Reynolds, June 30, 2002 
Jane Fitch's Book List
This is Why I Came website

Harvard Divinity School alumni
Boston College School of Theology and Ministry alumni
University of California, Los Angeles faculty
University of California, Riverside alumni
Year of birth missing (living people)
Living people